Isoline may refer to:

Contour line (line of constant elevation or depth, sometimes used to describe other lines of constant value)
 A line of constant value on a map or chart. Examples include isobar (equal barometric pressure), isotherm (equal temperature), and isohyet (equal precipitation).
Isoline (opera), an opera by André Messager